Booker 'n' Brass is an album by American jazz saxophonist Booker Ervin featuring performances recorded in 1967 for the Pacific Jazz label.

Reception
The Allmusic review by Michael G. Nastos awarded the album 3½ stars and stated: "To hear Booker Ervin as the leading solo voice on a recording with a larger ensemble is a treat, not only for his fans, but for those interested in modern big-band sounds grown from the bop era that are flavored with urban blues".

Track listing
 "East Dallas Special" (Booker Ervin) - 4:37 
 "Salt Lake City" (Johnny Lange, Leon René) - 4:22 
 "Do You Know What It Means to Miss New Orleans?" (Louis Alter, Edgar DeLange) - 4:28 
 "L.A. After Dark" [Master - Take 6] (Teddy Edwards) - 5:03 
 "Kansas City" (Jerry Leiber, Mike Stoller) - 3:00 
 "Baltimore Oriole" (Hoagy Carmichael, Paul Francis Webster) - 4:42 
 "Harlem Nocturne" (Earle Hagen, Dick Rogers) - 4:18 
 "I Left My Heart in San Francisco" (George Cory, Douglass Cross) - 4:13 
 "St. Louis Blues" (W. C. Handy) - 4:11 
 "L.A. After Dark" [Alternate Take 3] (Edwards) - 5:08 Bonus track on CD reissue
 "L.A. After Dark" [Alternate Take 7] (Edwards) - 5:05 Bonus track on CD reissue 
Recorded at Webster Hall in New York City on September 12 (tracks 4, 6 & 9-11), September 13 (tracks 1, 2 & 5), and September 14 (tracks 3, 7 & 8), 1967.

Personnel
Booker Ervin - tenor saxophone 
Martin Banks (tracks 1-3, 5, 7 & 8), Johnny Coles (tracks 1, 2 & 5), Ray Copeland, Freddie Hubbard (tracks 3, 4 & 6-11), Charles Tolliver (tracks 4, 6 & 9-11), Richard Williams - trumpet
Garnett Brown (tracks 3, 4 & 6-11), Bennie Green, Britt Woodman (tracks 1, 2 & 5) - trombone
Benny Powell (tracks 1-3, 5, 7 & 8) - bass trombone
Kenny Barron - piano
Reggie Johnson - bass
Lenny McBrowne - drums
Teddy Edwards - arranger, conductor

References 

Pacific Jazz Records albums
Booker Ervin albums
1967 albums
Albums arranged by Teddy Edwards
Albums conducted by Teddy Edwards